Giovanni Joseph (born 13 June 1989) is a South African cricketer. He made his first-class debut for Northern Cape in the 2007–08 CSA Provincial Three-Day Competition on 14 February 2008. He made his List A debut for Northern Cape in the 2014–15 CSA Provincial One-Day Competition on 18 January 2015.

References

External links
 

1989 births
Living people
South African cricketers
Northern Cape cricketers
Place of birth missing (living people)